Little Soldier was the head chief of the Yankton Dakota. He was a member of a delegation that signed a treaty with the United States government on June 22, 1825. He signed the Treaty of Fort Laramie in 1868. He also took part in the Battle of Little Bighorn.

References
 "Famous Indian Chiefs" from www.axel-jacob.de, URL accessed on March 6, 2006

Year of death missing
Native American leaders
Yankton Dakota people
People of the Great Sioux War of 1876
Year of birth unknown
19th-century Native Americans